The 2013 Oklahoma State Cowboys football team represented Oklahoma State University in the 2013 NCAA Division I FBS football season. The Cowboys were led by ninth year head coach Mike Gundy and played their home games at Boone Pickens Stadium in Stillwater, Oklahoma. They were a charter member of the Big 12 Conference. They finished the season 10–3, 7–2 in Big 12 play to finish in a three way for second place. They were invited to the Cotton Bowl Classic where they lost to Missouri.

Personnel

Coaching staff

Schedule

Schedule Source:

Game summaries

vs. Mississippi State

UTSA

Lamar

West Virginia

Kansas State

TCU

Iowa State

Texas Tech

Kansas

Texas

Baylor

Oklahoma

Missouri

Rankings

References

Oklahoma State
Oklahoma State Cowboys football seasons
Oklahoma State Cowboys football